Julius L. Wieman (May 30, 1864 Brooklyn, Kings County, New York – October 31, 1902 Williamsburg, Brooklyn, New York City) was an American politician from New York.

Life
He attended Turn Hall (a German school) and Public School No. 18, both in Brooklyn. Then he engaged in the importing of china and glassware. Later he engaged in the real estate and insurance business.

Wieman was a member of the New York State Assembly (Kings Co., 18th D.) in 1894 and 1895.

He was a member of the New York State Senate (9th D.) from 1896 to 1898, sitting in the 119th, 120th and 121st New York State Legislatures.

On December 30, 1899, the outgoing judge of the Third Municipal District Court, William Schnitzspan, appointed Wieman as Chief Clerk of the Court, for a term of six years. Two days later, the newly elected judge, William P. Lynch, upon taking office refused to recognize Wieman and appointed John W. Carpenter as Chief Clerk. The case was taken through the courts, and the New York Court of Appeals decided against Wieman.

In 1901, Wieman was appointed as Chief Clerk of the Kings County Court. He died on October 31, 1902, at his home at 695 Bushwick Avenue in Williamsburg, Brooklyn, of "typhoid pneumonia".

Sources
The New York Red Book compiled by Edgar L. Murlin (published by James B. Lyon, Albany NY, 1897; pg. 175f, 404 and 511)
Sketches of the members of the Legislature in The Evening Journal Almanac (1895; pg. 57)
APPOINTMENTS IN BROOKLYN in NYT on December 31, 1899
ROW OVER COURT CLERKSHIP in NYT on January 2, 1900
Ousting of a Court Clerk Invalid in NYT on February 16, 1900
DEATH LIST OF A DAY; Julius L. Wieman in NYT on November 1, 1902

1864 births
1902 deaths
Republican Party New York (state) state senators
People from Brooklyn
Republican Party members of the New York State Assembly
People from Williamsburg, Brooklyn
19th-century American politicians